The FBI Pyramid: From the Inside is a 1979 non-fiction book by, W. Mark Felt.

Mark Felt was the associate director of the United States Federal Bureau of Investigation (FBI), the effective second in command to J. Edgar Hoover and subsequently L. Patrick Gray III.  The book chronicles the FBI bureaucracy during the 1960s and 1970s. The book gained interest in 2005, with the revelation that Felt was "Deep Throat", the Watergate scandal whistleblower who assisted Washington Post reporter Bob Woodward in his and Carl Bernstein's investigation. By 2005, Felt was in declining health and unable or unwilling to explain why he assisted in the Washington Post'''s journalists with their stories, which ultimately led to the resignation of U.S. President Richard Nixon. Many looked to the book to explain Felt's motivation. In the book, Felt denies the notion that he was Deep Throat."

The book was co-written with Hoover biographer Ralph de Toledano, though the latter's name appears only in the copyright notice. In 2005, Toledano wrote that the volume was "largely written by me since his original manuscript read like The Autocrat of the Breakfast-Table''." Toledano also said: "Felt swore to me that he was not Deep Throat, that he had never leaked information to the Woodward-Bernstein team or anyone else. The book was published and bombed."

Footnotes 

1979 non-fiction books
American non-fiction books
Books about politics of the United States
Books about the Federal Bureau of Investigation
G. P. Putnam's Sons books